= Fragile Frontiers: The Secret History of Mumbai Terror Attacks =

Book by Saroj Kumar Rath

- Second edition
- Author: Saroj Kumar Rath
- Publisher: Routledge
- Publication date: August 2014; Second Edition 2018

Fragile Frontiers: The Secret History of Mumbai Terror Attacks is a book by Indian writer Saroj Kumar Rath, published by Routledge, London and simultaneously published in India and the United States in August 2014. The book is about terrorism in South Asia, centering on the 2008 Mumbai attacks.

As per Times of India, 'The book goes on to raise several questions over the way the investigations into the 26/11 attacks was handled, and the very shallow chargesheet filed in the case.' The Hindu, in its analysis written that, 'The book is refreshingly honest, thoroughly researched, and goes deep under the skin of the event with toothcomb precision. What sets its writing apart and above all the others that have come in the wake of the event is the incisive inquiry and the detail.' 'According to The Secret History of Mumbai Terror Attacks, the prosecution relieved the real criminals behind the actual crime. The name of ISI does not figure in the chargesheet and the LeT is also scantily defined.' This is 'Most well-written book on the Mumbai terror attacks.'
